Birck is a surname belonging to several prominent people.

 Sixt Birck (1501–1554), German scholar
 Wenzel Raimund Birck (1718–1763), European composer
 Michael Birck (born 1938), American businessman

It may also be used as a given name.

Birck Elgaaen (born 1917), Norwegian equestrian

See also (homonyms)
 Berck
 Burck
 Berk (disambiguation)
 Birk (disambiguation)
 Burk (disambiguation)